The Right Mistake is a 2015 Chinese romantic comedy film directed by Wang Ning. It was released on March 5, 2015.

Cast
Xiaoshenyang
Tian Liang
Jordan Chan
Lynn Hung
Li Chengru
Christy Chung
Ying Da
Fann Wong
Wang Lidan

Box office
The film opened at No. 8 in its opening weekend at the Chinese box office with US$3.65 million.

References

Chinese romantic comedy films
2015 romantic comedy films
2010s Mandarin-language films